Jules Joseph Augustin Laurens, commonly known as Jules Laurens, (26 July 1825, Carpentras - 5 May 1901, Saint-Didier, Vaucluse) was a French artist in drawing, painting, and lithography who is remembered above all for his Oriental works.

Early life

One of a family of five, at the age of 12 he went to live with his brother, Jean-Joseph (1801–1890) in Montpellier where he attended the city's art college while benefitting from his brother's artistic contacts. He went on to Paris, studying under Paul Delaroche at the École des Beaux-Arts,  first exhibiting in 1840 and completing his studies in 1846.

Career

Laurens was chosen by the geographer Xavier Hommaire de Hell to join him on an extended scientific journey to Turkey and Persia (1846-1848). During this time, Laurens made over a thousand drawings of the sites, costumes and people he encountered on his travels. They included many portraits of Persian personalities. His biography "Nazar-Andaz" gives an account of de Hell's death at Isfahan in August 1848. Thanks to the French ambassador, Laurens was able to reach Tehran from where he sent back de Hell's notes together with his own drawings. Hundreds of them were presented in the Atlas historique et scientifique, the fourth volume of the Voyage en Turquie et en Perse published by de Hell's wife. Some of Laurens' lithographs were published in L'Illustration and Tour du Monde, both popular periodicals, while the originals, together with his early watercolours were given to the library of the École des Beaux-Arts. Laurens also painted examples of qajar art while in Persia, including his Danseuse au tambourin.

Laurens continued his career in France after returning in 1849, exhibiting paintings and engravings in virtually every Salon from 1850 to 1891. He was also active in literary circles where he met many celebrities. His La Légende des ateliers, published in his later days, contains anecdotes of his travels.

Works

Les rochers de Vann, Musée d’Orsay
Campagne de Téhéran, Avignon
L’hiver en Perse, Bagnères
Ruines de palais persan, Carpentras
La mosquée bleue à Tauris, Montpellier 
Village fortifié dans le Khorassan, Toulon

References

Further reading
Atlas historique et scientifique, Paris, 1859; = Tome IV of Voyage en Turquie et en Perse exécuté par ordre du gouvernement français pendant les années 1846, 1847 et 1848 par Xavier Hommaire de Hell, Paris, 1856-59.
André Alauzen Di Genova, Dictionnaire des peintres et sculpteurs de Provence, Alpes, Côte d'Azur, Editions Jeanne Laffite, 1986
J. Laurens, Nazar-endaz, Episode d’un voyage en Perse, Revue orientale et algérienne, 1853–54, pp. 342–51; repr. in J. Laurens, La légende des ateliers, Paris, 1901.
Studies. L.-H. Labande, Jules Laurens, Paris, 1910.
Laurens (Jules-Joseph-Augustin) in E. Bénézit, ed., Dictionnaire des Peintres, Sculpteurs, Dessinateurs et Graveurs, Bénézit, Paris, 1976, VI, pp. 481–82.
Lynne Thornton, Les Orientalistes Peintres voyageurs, ACR Édition Poche Couleur, Courbevoie, 1994. .
 

19th-century French painters
French male painters
French landscape painters
19th-century French lithographers
1825 births
1901 deaths
People from Carpentras
19th-century French male artists